The  Maggie S. Myers  is an oyster schooner, built in 1893 reportedly at Bridgeton, New Jersey. The rigging was removed in the 1940s, when the vessel was converted to power. She is maintained and used for oyster dredging on the waters of the Delaware Bay.

She was restored by her current owner, Frank "Thumper" Eicherly IV of Bowers Beach, Delaware, and ran on both sail as well as combustion. She sank on December 23, 2022, but was refloated several days later.

She was listed on the National Register of Historic Places in 1983.

A similar oyster dredging schooner, the Katherine M. Lee, which is also listed on the NRHP, was also docked near Front and Lombard streets in Leipsic, Delaware.

References

External links
video of beginning of the restoration

Schooners of the United States
Ships on the National Register of Historic Places in Delaware
National Register of Historic Places in Kent County, Delaware
1893 ships
Ships built in New Jersey
Oyster schooners
Fishing ships of the United States
Leipsic, Delaware